The canton of Chauvigny is an administrative division of the Vienne department, western France. Its borders were modified at the French canton reorganisation which came into effect in March 2015. Its seat is in Chauvigny.

It consists of the following communes:
 
Archigny
Availles-en-Châtellerault
Bellefonds
Bonneuil-Matours
Cenon-sur-Vienne
Chapelle-Viviers
Chauvigny
Fleix
Lauthiers
Leignes-sur-Fontaine
Monthoiron
Paizay-le-Sec
Sainte-Radégonde
Valdivienne
Vouneuil-sur-Vienne

References

Cantons of Vienne